Catocala chenyixini is a moth in the family Erebidae. It is found in China (Chekiang).

References

chenyixini
Moths described in 2011
Moths of Asia